Orazio Romanzi (born 16 September 1970) is an Italian male retired racewalker, which participated at the 1997 World Championships in Athletics.

Achievements

References

External links
 

1970 births
Living people
Italian male racewalkers
World Athletics Championships athletes for Italy
20th-century Italian people